Compeed (contraction of "Competition" and "Seed") is a brand of hydrocolloid gel plasters for treating blisters, corns, cracked heels and cold sores. It was originally developed by Lars Backsell while working in Denmark for Coloplast A/S. The brand was sold to Johnson & Johnson in May 2002, which was then acquired by HRA Pharma in 2017. Compeed plasters are still manufactured by Coloplast.

The product originally was designed for treating ostomy patients.

History 

1984 - Lars Backsell, while working as a General Manager at Coloplast, identified an untapped niche in the plaster market for band aids that help relieve blisters from certain sports. Lars conducted a clinical trial with the Swedish army to test a prototype that was used to develop a skin barrier for bandaging purposes based on hydrocolloid technology. The initial product used an ostomy sheet and sold as a blister protective bandage through pharmacies to consumers.

1986 - Compeed was first sold in Sweden before being registered in the USA in the category of antiseptic cleaning tissues as a trademark under serial number 73589785.

1988 - Compeed got FDA approval.

2002 - "Compeed X-TREME Flex" plaster by Jan Marcussen included into MoMA design collection.

2002 - The brand sold to Johnson & Johnson in May 2002

2004 - "Compeed X-TREME Flex" plaster wins Danish Design Award.

2007 - Compeed was awarded Nicholas Hall's New Product of the Year.

Technology 
The hydrocolloidal plaster contains croscarmellose sodium (an internally cross-linked sodium carboxymethylcellulose, water-soluble polymer), and tackifier resins. The top level of the plaster is made of elastomer (that ensures that the plaster stays on skin even while moving) and polyurethane film.

When applied to the blister, it starts to absorb body liquids turning into a soft mass that cushions the blister. It seals the blister forming so-called "second skin". The plaster doesn't heal the wound. It prevents the blister from developing and helps new skin to grow underneath the plaster.

The cushioned zone created by the plaster relieves pain and protects the wound from rubbing. The plaster repels water, and stops dirt and germs from entering the wound, thus preventing infection.

At first, the plaster absorbs all the moisture from the blister but over time it becomes more permeable so the wound dries out. Unlike ordinary dressings, the hydrocolloidal plaster stays on the wound for several days and it stays on even in the shower.

The corn removing plaster works in a similar way. Only that it absorbs the moisture resulting from salicylic acid acting on the corn (dissolving it).

Consumer research 
Compeed conducts consumer insight research.

2012 research indicated that 58 percent of women take off their shoes during a night out because of the pain. It also showed that the average heel worn by British women is 3.3 inches, the highest heels across Europe.

Endorsers 

Compeed endorsers include tennis players Roger Federer and Caroline Wozniacki as well as British actress Victoria Shalet.

References 

First aid